Michael Preston (born 1938) is an English film actor and singer.

Michael Preston may also refer to:
Michael Preston (American football) (born 1989), American football wide receiver
Michael Preston (author), writer under the pen name Alex Rutherford
Michael Preston (footballer) (born 1977), English footballer
Michael J. Preston, American academic
Mike Preston (curler) (born 1944), Welsh wheelchair curler